Streptomyces lacrimifluminis is a bacterium species from the genus of Streptomyces which has been isolated from soil near the Tuotuo River from the Qinghai-Tibet Plateau from China. Streptomyces lacrimifluminis produces antibacterial compounds.

See also 
 List of Streptomyces species

References

External links
Type strain of Streptomyces lacrimifluminis at BacDive -  the Bacterial Diversity Metadatabase

lacrimifluminis
Bacteria described in 2016